Conway is a village located in Union Parish in the state of Louisiana. The village is 8.3 miles north of Farmerville, the parish seat.

Highways
  Louisiana Highway 348
  Louisiana Highway 549

Villages in Louisiana
Villages in Union Parish, Louisiana
Villages in Monroe, Louisiana metropolitan area